Danilo Mariotto dos Santos (born 15 January 1996), known as Danilo Mariotto or simply Mariotto, is a Brazilian footballer who plays as a forward, most recently for Al-Washm.

Mariotto started his professional career in the team of Fluminense as product of the youth sportive system. In August 2014 he was transferred on loan to Ukrainian side Volyn Lutsk where he made his debut for in the match against FC Chornomorets Odesa on 11 August 2014 in the Ukrainian Premier League.

References

External links

1996 births
Living people
Footballers from Rio de Janeiro (city)
Brazilian footballers
Association football forwards
Fluminense FC players
Associação Portuguesa de Desportos players
FC Volyn Lutsk players
Slovenian PrvaLiga players
Ukrainian Premier League players
NK Olimpija Ljubljana (2005) players
FC ŠTK 1914 Šamorín players
Boavista Sport Club players
Associação Atlética Caldense players
Toledo Esporte Clube players
Al-Washm Club players
Campeonato Brasileiro Série D players
Saudi Second Division players
Brazilian expatriate footballers
Brazilian expatriate sportspeople in Ukraine
Expatriate footballers in Ukraine
Brazilian expatriate sportspeople in Slovenia
Expatriate footballers in Slovenia
Brazilian expatriate sportspeople in Saudi Arabia
Expatriate footballers in Saudi Arabia